Aleksandr Gintsburg (1 March 1907 – 10 March 1972) was a Soviet cameraman and film director. He graduated from the Leningrad Phototechnicum in 1927 and from the Leningrad Electrotechnical Institute in 1934.

Selected filmography
 Bolnye nervy (1929)
 Transport of Fire (1930)
 Zagovor myortvyh (1930)
 Son of the Land (1931)
 Shame (1932)
 Peasants (1935)
 Zhenitba Zhana Knukke (1935)
 City of Youth (1938)
 The Great Beginning (1939)
 Shestdesyat dney (1940)
 Wings of Victory (1941)
 Yego zovut Sukhe-Bator (1942) 
 Two Soldiers (1943)
 Eto bylo v Donbasse (1949)
 Private Aleksandr Matrosov (1949)
 The Secret Brigade (1949)
 Who Laughs Last (1954)
 Cinderella (1960)
 The Hyperboloid of Engineer Garin (1965)

Honours and awards
 Honored Art Worker of the RSFSR (1969)
 Honored Art Worker of the Byelorussian SSR (1955)

References

External links

1907 births
1972 deaths
Soviet film directors
People from Rahachow